Defying Gravity is a multi-nationally produced space travel television science fiction drama series which first aired on August 2, 2009 on ABC and CTV and was canceled in October 2009. Set in the year 2052, the series follows eight astronauts (four women and four men) from four countries on a six-year space mission through the Solar System, during which they are monitored from Earth via a real-time communication system. The series was pitched to networks as "Grey's Anatomy in space". Thirteen episodes of the series were produced before it was cancelled, only eight of which were shown on ABC, though the full run was shown in other countries or online.

Premise 
The program follows the adventures of eight astronauts on board the international spacecraft Antares, the next ambitious crewed space mission after the Mars landing. The lives of the astronauts are being constantly recorded and broadcast back to Earth both as part of an ongoing documentary and as part of mission monitoring. Despite a libido-suppressing device worn by each crew member, referred to as "HALO" for "Hormone Activated Libido Oppressors", romantic entanglements develop among some crew members. Further complicating their lives is a mysterious storage pod that contains something referred to as Beta, which is exerting an influence on their mission.

Characters

On Antares 
 Evram Mintz (Eyal Podell) is the ship's doctor and psychiatrist. He's Claire Dereux's boyfriend. Mintz is from Israel, where he served in the IDF.
 Jen Crane (Christina Cox) is a biologist, she's married to Rollie Crane and had a past relationship with Ted Shaw. She's from Canada.
 Maddux Donner (Ron Livingston) is the chief engineer. Sharon Lewis was his lover before she died during a mission on Mars, he currently has a casual sexual relationship with Nadia Schilling, and has an awkward relation with Zoe Barnes. He's from Iowa, USA.
 Nadia Schilling (Florentine Lahme) is a pilot. She has a casual sexual relationship with Maddux Donner. Nadia is from Germany. Series creator James Parriott later stated that the intention was to reveal later in the series that Nadia was actually intersex, and the effects of the beta object were changing her into the male she could have been.
 Paula Morales (Paula Garcés) is the payload specialist, lander pilot and is responsible for an on-board documentary for kids. She's from Brownsville, Texas.
 Steve Wassenfelder (Dylan Taylor) is a theoretical physicist and a porn connoisseur. He is from the United States.
 Ted Shaw (Malik Yoba) is the Antares commander. He is married to Eve Weller and had a relationship with Jen Crane in the past. He's from the United States.
 Zoe Barnes (Laura Harris) is a geologist. She had a one-night stand with Maddux Donner who is unaware that it resulted in an aborted pregnancy. She's from Canada, but also votes for the next American president in the episode Deja Vu.

On Earth 
 Ajay Sharma (Zahf Paroo) was the original flight engineer but after a heart problem caused by Beta he was reinstated to mission control. He's from Mumbai, India.
 Claire Dereux (Maxim Roy) is the flight surgeon and Evram Mintz's girlfriend. She is from Montreal, Canada.
 Eve Weller-Shaw (Karen LeBlanc) works alongside Goss. She works for the Bertram Corporation and was in charge of crew selection. Eve is married to Ted Shaw and is from New Orleans, LA, USA as referenced in Episode 09 "Eve Ate The Apple".
 Mike Goss (Andrew Airlie) is the mission control flight director. He was on the Mars mission.
 Rollie Crane (Ty Olsson) is the former Antares commander and currently works in mission control. He's married to Jen Crane. He is from the United States
 Arnel Poe (William C Vaughan) works in mission control. He lost his leg during his training for qualification for the Antares mission. He is from the United States.
 Trevor Williams (Peter Howitt) is a journalist from the United Kingdom. He suspects that ISO isn't telling the truth about the Antares mission and tries to find out.

On Mars 
 Sharon Lewis (Lara Gilchrist) was left behind together with Walker during a previous Mars mission. She was Donner's former lover.
 Jeff Walker (Rick Ravanello) was left behind on Mars with Lewis.

Development 
The project was inspired by the BBC fictional documentary miniseries Space Odyssey: Voyage to the Planets, broadcast on BBC One in 2004. The show was co-produced by the BBC, Fox Television Studios, and Omni Film Productions, in association with Canadian broadcasters CTV Television Network and SPACE, as well as German broadcaster ProSieben.

Thirteen episodes were initially ordered, and filming began on January 19, 2009, in Vancouver, British Columbia, Canada, North America, lasting six months. CGI effects were handled by Stargate Studios, in collaboration with set designer Stephen Geaghan.

Episodes

Broadcast 
On June 30, 2009, ABC announced that it had ordered the program for a summer 2009 broadcast in the United States. The show began on October 21, 2009 on BBC Two and BBC HD in the United Kingdom, and has aired on both CTV and SPACE in Canada, and is set to air on ProSieben in Germany. All 13 episodes aired in November / December 2009 on Arena TV in Australia.

CTV moved the scheduled airing of the show from Sunday to Friday nights on August 26, 2009, and speculation began about the possibility of the show being canceled. On September 14, 2009, online sources noted ABC's apparent cancellation of the series, with most having reported the eighth episode as the "series finale", while others reported it as the "season finale". The show's publicist, Nicole Marostica, issued a statement on September 14, 2009 that ABC is not in fact canceling the show but that management is deciding on a time slot to air the remaining 5 episodes of season 1.

CTV aired episode 9, Eve Ate the Apple on September 18, 2009, but did not have Defying Gravity on its schedule for the following week. The remaining four episodes were aired on SPACE, which is only available in Canada. On October 22, 2009, TV Squad reported that the sets for Defying Gravity had been destroyed and that the series had been canceled.  On October 29, 2009, creator James Parriott revealed to CliqueClack TV how the series would have continued, had the show gone past its first season. Parriott explained that he has the first three seasons plotted out in a show "bible", along with how it would ultimately end. Also reported was that the remaining episodes that did not air in the U.S. would not be shown on television, but would appear later on Hulu and iTunes. The series was released to DVD on January 19, 2010.  All online content regarding the show was removed from the ABC website as of November 18, 2009, and is no longer available on Hulu.

DVD releases

Ratings

US Nielsen ratings

Canadian BBM ratings

UK BARB ratings

References 

Character biographies

Defying Gravity cast
 Maddux Donner (Ron Livingston) at ctv.ca (retrieved on 12/12/09)
 Zoe Barnes (Laura Harris) at ctv.ca (retrieved on 12/12/09)
 Ted Shaw (Malik Yoba) at ctv.ca (retrieved on 12/12/09)
 Jen Crane (Christina Cox) at ctv.ca (retrieved on 12/12/09)
 Nadia Schilling (Florentine Lahme) at ctv.ca (retrieved on 12/12/09)
 Dr. Evram Mintz (Eyal Podell) at ctv.ca (retrieved on 12/12/09)

External links 
 Defying Gravity - CTV.ca (CTV)
 Defying Gravity - SPACEcast.ca (SPACE)
 Defying Gravity - BBC.co.uk (BBC Two)
 
 How Defying Gravity would have ended - Cliqueclack.com

2000s American science fiction television series
2009 American television series debuts
2009 American television series endings
2000s Canadian science fiction television series
2009 Canadian television series debuts
2009 Canadian television series endings
2000s British drama television series
2009 British television series debuts
2009 British television series endings
2009 German television series debuts
2009 German television series endings
American Broadcasting Company original programming
BBC television dramas
CTV Television Network original programming
English-language television shows
ProSieben original programming
CTV Sci-Fi Channel original programming
Television shows filmed in Vancouver
Television series about space programs
Television series by 20th Century Fox Television
Space adventure television series
Mars in television
Venus in television
Fiction set in 2042
Fiction set in 2047
Fiction set in 2052
2000s British science fiction television series